Ferro (iron) and vitreous (glass) construction combined the use of glass and iron in the eighteenth century and can be seen developing as early as the seventeenth century. Popularized during the Industrial Revolution as iron and steel production became more common throughout Europe and frequently utilized in world exhibitions.  Notable examples include Paxton's Crystal Palace, the Palm House at Kew Gardens, and the Coal Exchange.

References

Architectural styles